The discography of British indie rock band Klaxons consists of three studio albums, one compilation album, one extended play (EP), and nine singles. Klaxons were formed in October 2005 in New Cross, London by Jamie Reynolds, James Righton and Simon Taylor-Davis. Steffan Halperin joined as an official member in February 2007.

Klaxons debut single "Gravity's Rainbow" was released on 27 March 2006, through the Angular Recording Corporation. The release was limited to 500 copies and on 7-inch vinyl only. Second single "Atlantis to Interzone" was released on 12 June 2006, before signing with major label Polydor Records two months later. Klaxons' debut EP Xan Valleys, a compilation of both previous singles alongside various remixes, was released on 17 October 2006.

The band released their debut album Myths of the Near Future worldwide in January 2007. The record debuted at number two on the UK Albums Chart, and spent five weeks on the Billboard Heatseekers Albums Chart, peaking at number 22. The album spawned multiple singles, with the highest charting "Golden Skans" peaking at number 7 on the UK Singles Chart. Myths of the Near Future won the Nationwide Mercury Prize, and was certified Platinum in the United Kingdom on 21 September 2007.

During touring and promotion of Myths.., Klaxons released A Bugged Out Mix by Klaxons on 1 October 2007, their second album and first compilation album of multiple artists' songs. Three years following, Klaxons released their second studio album Surfing the Void on 23 August 2010. The album charted highest in the United Kingdom, peaking at number ten on the UK Albums Chart. The album also charted in multiple countries worldwide, including number fifteen on the ARIA Charts, their first charting album in Australia.

Studio albums

Compilation albums

EPs

Singles

Music videos

Notes

References

External links

Rock music group discographies